Tetraphenylarsonium chloride is the organoarsenic compound with the formula (C6H5)4AsCl.  This white solid is the chloride salt of the tetraphenylarsonium cation, which is tetrahedral. Typical of related quat salts, it is soluble in polar organic solvents.  It often is used as a hydrate.

Synthesis and reactions
It is prepared by neutralization of tetraphenylarsonium chloride hydrochloride, which is produced from triphenylarsine:
(C6H5)3As  +  Br2   →   (C6H5)3AsBr2 
(C6H5)3AsBr2  + H2O  →  (C6H5)3AsO  +  2 HBr
 (C6H5)3AsO  +   C6H5MgBr  →  (C6H5)4AsOMgBr
(C6H5)4AsOMgBr  +  3 HCl  →  (C6H5)4AsCl.HCl  +  MgBrCl
(C6H5)4AsCl.HCl  +  NaOH  →  (C6H5)4AsCl  +  NaCl  +  H2O

Like other quat salts, it is used to solubilize polyatomic anions in organic media.  To this end, aqueous or methanolic solutions containing the anion of interest are treated with a solution of tetraphenylarsonium chloride, typically resulting in precipitation of the tetraphenylarsonium anion salt.

Related compounds 
Tetraphenylphosphonium chloride
Tetrabutylammonium chloride
Tetraethylammonium chloride

References

Chlorides
Phenyl compounds